Sepioloidea pacifica, also known as the Pacific bobtail squid, is a species of cuttlefish native to the southern Pacific Ocean; it occurs off New Zealand in the west and in the Nazca and Sala y Gomez submarine ridges in the east.

The type specimen was collected off New Zealand and is deposited at the National Museum of New Zealand in Wellington. Sepioloidea pacifica was first described as a species in 1882 by T.W. Kirk.

Morphology

Mantle 
Male mantles can grow up to 19 mm in length, and female mantles can grow up to 26 mm in length.

Suckers 
Sepioloidea pacifica have rows of 5 biserial suckers, with the largest suckers closer to the edge of the arms.

References

External links 

 Deep sea photography

Cephalopods of Oceania
Cuttlefish
Molluscs described in 1882
Molluscs of New Zealand
Molluscs of the Pacific Ocean